The Nadășa or Chiher is a small river in the Gurghiu Mountains, Mureș County, northern Romania. It is a left tributary of the river Beica. It flows towards the northwest and discharges into the Beica in the village Beica de Jos.

References

Rivers of Romania
Rivers of Mureș County